Abd al-Muttalib (c.497–578) was the grandfather of Muhammad.

Abd al-Muttalib, Abdul-Muttalib, or variations of this name,  may also refer to:

 Al-Harith ibn Abd al-Muttalib (fl. 6th century), uncle of Muhammad
 Az-Zubayr ibn Abd al-Muttalib (fl. 6th century), paternal uncle of Muhammad
 Barrah bint Abdul Muttalib (fl. 6th century), aunt of Muhammad
 Abu Talib ibn Abd al-Muttalib (c. 539–c. 619), leader of Banu Hashim clan, Quraysh tribe, Mecca, Arabia
 Abdullah ibn Abdul-Muttalib (545–c.570), father of Muhammad
 Umm Hakim bint Abdul Muttalib (born c.546), paternal aunt of Muhammad
 Abu Lahab ibn 'Abdul Muttalib or Abu Lahab (c.549–624), paternal uncle of Muhammad
Umama bint Abdulmuttalib (born 540), paternal aunt of Muhammad
 Atika bint Abdul Muttalib (fl. 624), aunt of Muhammad
 Arwa bint Abdul Muttalib (born c.560), aunt of Muhammad
 Al-Abbas ibn Abd al-Muttalib (c.567–c.653), companion and paternal uncle of Muhammad
 Safiyyah bint Abd al-Muttalib (c.569–c.640), companion and aunt of Muhammad
 Hamza ibn Abdul-Muttalib (c.570–625), companion and paternal uncle of Muhammad
 Abdul Muttalib (Dai) (died 1354), 14th Dai of the Dawoodi Bohra Ismaili Muslims, 1345–1354
 Abdul Mutalib Mohamed Daud(1961–2013), was an ISA detainee
 Abdulmutalib Al-Traidi(born in 1982), Saudi Arabian footballer 
 Abd al-Muttalib ibn Ghalib (1790–1886), Emir and Grand Sharif of Mecca, 1827, 1851–1856, 1880–1881
 Abd al-Muttalib (Ibn al-Walid)(??–1354 CE),was the fourteenth Tayyibi Isma'ili Dāʿī al-Muṭlaq in Yemen
 Ismail Abdul Muttalib (born 1954), Member of the Parliament of Malaysia for Maran, Pahang
 Umar Farouk Abdulmutallab (born 1986), the "underwear bomber"

See also 

Arabic masculine given names